Azay-le-Ferron is a commune in the Indre department in central France.

It is situated in the parc naturel régional de la Brenne, spanning parts of the historic province of Berry and Touraine. Azay-Le-Ferron takes its name from ironworks, from which iron was extracted as late as the nineteenth century, and a deformation of aqua, "water".

The Château d'Azay-le-Ferron, upon which the ancient commune depended, ranges from fifteenth century construction—the round tower—to eighteenth century, harmonized by the warm stone of which it is built and the blue-gray slates of its various roofs. The ancestral seat of the family Hersent Luzarche, bequeathed to the city of Tours in 1951, now houses a collection of furniture, both of the French Renaissance and in Empire style. It is surrounded by a series of parterre gardens, some with clipped topiary, and a landscaped park.

Population

See also
Communes of the Indre department

References

Communes of Indre